Adrenaline is a 2015 American drama film directed by Joseph Quinn Simpkins and written by Michael Rosander, Alex Chatfield and Joseph Quinn Simpkins. It stars John Schneider, Charlene Amoia, Gregory Alan Williams, Cameron Arnett and Myke Holmes. The film centers around a drag racer who is left paraplegic by a car crash.

Plot 

 The film centers around a drag racer who is left paraplegic by a car crash.

Cast 
 Charlene Amoia as Josie Rigsby
 Gregory Alan Williams as Elijah Benjamin Salisbury
 Jim Cody Williams as Britt Brizzio
 Malaika Washington as Tiffany
 John Schneider as Paul Sharpe
 Irene Santiago as Diane Godwin
 Michael Rosander as Joseph Jenkins
 Anthony Reynolds as Jason Skynard
 Timmy Richardson as Miles
 Samantha Katelyn as Cindy
 Myke Holmes as Trace Mallery
 R. Keith Harris as Marcus
 GiGi Erneta as Nurse Amy

References

External links
 

2015 films
American auto racing films
American drama films
Teensploitation
2015 drama films
2010s English-language films
2010s American films